is a railway station on the Senmo Main Line in Shibecha, Hokkaido, Japan, operated by Hokkaido Railway Company (JR Hokkaido). Opened in 1927, the station is now permanently closed.

Lines
The station is numbered B60.

Station layout
The station has one side platform serving a single bidirectional line. The station is unstaffed.

Adjacent stations

History
The station opened on 15 September 1927. With the privatization of Japanese National Railways (JNR) on 1 April 1987, the station came under the control of JR Hokkaido.

In September 2016, JR Hokkaido announced that it intended to close the station from the start of the revised timetable in March 2017, due to low passenger usage.

Passenger statistics
In fiscal 2015, the station was used on average by less than one passenger daily.

Surrounding area
  National Route 391

See also
 List of railway stations in Japan

References

Stations of Hokkaido Railway Company
Railway stations in Hokkaido Prefecture
Railway stations in Japan opened in 1927
Railway stations closed in 2017
Defunct railway stations in Japan